Kapurthala (station code: KXH) is a railway station located in Kapurthala district in the Indian state of  Punjab and serves Kapurthala city. Kapurthala station is managed by Firozpur railway division of Northern Railway zone of Indian Railways.

The railway station 
The station is located on the single track,  broad gauge Jalandhar–Firozpur line. It is well connected to a number of major cities.

Electrification 
Currently the trains coming to Kapurthala are powered by diesel locomotives although electrification of the track is in pipeline.

Amenities 
Kapurthala railway station has computerized reservation counters, and all basic amenities. one ATM is available at the station,

References

External links 

 Pictures of Kapurthala station

Railway stations in Kapurthala district
Firozpur railway division